Amoria canaliculata, common name the channeled volute, is a species of sea snail, a marine gastropod mollusc in the family Volutidae, the volutes.

Description
The length of the shell varies between 30 mm and 70 mm.

Distribution
This marine species occurs off Queensland, East Australia.

References

 Bail P. & Limpus A. (2001) The genus Amoria. In: G.T. Poppe & K. Groh (eds) A conchological iconography. Hackenheim: Conchbooks. 50 pp., 93 pls.

External links
 
 

Volutidae
Gastropods described in 1869